Guru Arjan (Gurmukhi: ਗੁਰੂ ਅਰਜਨ,; 15 April 1563 – 30 May 1606)  was the first of the two Gurus martyred in the Sikh faith and the fifth of the ten total Sikh Gurus. He compiled the first official edition of the Sikh scripture called the Adi Granth, which later expanded into the Guru Granth Sahib.

He was born in Goindval, in the Punjab, the youngest son of Bhai Jetha, who later became Guru Ram Das, and Mata Bhani, the daughter of Guru Amar Das. He completed the construction of Darbar Sahib at Amritsar, after the fourth Sikh Guru founded the town and built a sarovar. Guru Arjan compiled the hymns of previous Gurus and of other saints into Adi Granth, the first edition of the Sikh scripture, and installed it in the Harimandir Sahib.

Guru Arjan reorganized the Masands system initiated by Guru Ram Das, by suggesting that the Sikhs donate, if possible, one-tenth of their income, goods or service to the Sikh organization (dasvandh). The Masand not only collected these funds but also taught tenets of Sikhism and settled civil disputes in their region. The dasvand financed the building of gurdwaras and langars (shared communal kitchens).

Guru Arjan was arrested under the orders of the Mughal Emperor Jahangir and asked to convert to Islam. He refused, was tortured and executed in 1606 CE. Historical records and the Sikh tradition are unclear as to whether Guru Arjan was executed by drowning or died during torture. His martyrdom is considered a watershed event in the history of Sikhism. It is remembered as Shaheedi Divas of Guru Arjan in May or June according to the Nanakshahi calendar released by the Shiromani Gurdwara Parbandhak Committee in 2003.

Early life
Guru Arjan was born in Goindval to Bibi Bhani and Jetha Sodhi. Bibi Bhani was the daughter of Guru Amar Das, and her husband Jetha Sodhi later came to be known as Guru Ram Das. Guru Arjan's birthplace site is now memorialized as the Gurdwara Chaubara Sahib. He had two brothers: Prithi Chand and Mahadev. Various Sikh chroniclers give his birth year as 1553 or 1563, the latter is accepted by scholarly consensus as the actual year of birth with 15 April as the accepted birth date.
Guru Arjan spent the first 11 years of his life in Goindwal and the next seven years with his father in Ramdaspur. Per Sikh tradition, he had stayed for two years in Lahore during his youth after being sent by his father to attend the wedding of his first cousin Sahari Mal's son as well as to establish a Sikh congregation. He was appointed as the Sikh Guru in 1581 after the death of his father. Guru Ram Das was a Khatri of the Sodhi sub-caste. With Guru Arjan's succession, the Guruship remained in the Sodhi family of Guru Ram Das.

Succession

Guru Ram Das chose Arjan, the youngest, to succeed him as the fifth Sikh Guru. Mahadev, the middle brother chose the life of an ascetic. His choice of Arjan as successor, as throughout most of the history of Sikh Guru successions, led to disputes and internal divisions among the Sikhs.

The succession dispute regarding Guru Arjan created a schism that yielded different narratives for the two factions. In the orthodox Sikh tradition, Prithi Chand is remembered as vehemently opposing Guru Arjan, creating a factional sect of the Sikh community. The Sikhs following Guru Arjan referred to the breakaway faction as Minas (literally, "scoundrels"), who are alleged to have attempted to assassinate young Hargobind, and befriended Mughal agents.  Subsequent written competing texts written by the Minas, on the other hand, offered a different explanation for the attempt on Hargobind's life, and present him as devoted to his younger brother Guru Arjan. The eldest son of Prithi Chand, Miharvan, is mentioned in both traditions as having received tutelage from both Prithi Chand and Guru Arjan as a child.

The competing texts acknowledge the disagreements. They state Prithi Chand left Amritsar, became the Sahib Guru after the martyrdom of Guru Arjan and one who disputed the succession of Guru Hargobind as the next Guru. The followers of Prithi Chand considered themselves the true followers of Guru Nanak as they rejected the increasing emphasis on militarization of the panth under Guru Hargobind to resist Mughal persecution in the wake of Guru Arjan's martyrdom, in favor of non-violent interiorization. In addition to Prithi Chand, a son of Guru Amar Das named Baba Mohan had also challenged the authority of Guru Arjan. These challenging claims were asserted by the early Sikh sects in part by their manuscripts of Sikh hymns. Baba Mohan possessed the Goindval pothi containing the hymns of Nanak and other early Gurus, while Prithi Chand possessed the Guru Harsahai pothi then believed to have been the oldest scripture from the time of Guru Nanak. This, state scholars, may have triggered Guru Arjan to create a much enlarged, official version of the Adi Granth.

The mainstream Sikh tradition recognised Guru Arjan as the fifth Guru, and Hargobind as the sixth Guru. Arjan, at age 18, became the fifth Guru in 1581 inheriting the title from his father. After his execution by the Muslim officials of the Mughal Empire, his son Hargobind became the sixth Guru in 1606 CE.

Death
 
Guru Arjan died in Mughal custody; this has been one of the defining, though controversial, issues in Sikh history.

Most Mughal historians considered Guru Arjan's execution as a political event, stating that the Sikhs had become formidable as a social group, and Sikh Gurus became actively involved in the Punjabi political conflicts. A similar theory floated in the early 20th-century, asserts that this was just a politically-motivated single execution. According to this theory, there was an ongoing Mughal dynasty dispute between Jahangir and his son Khusrau suspected of rebellion by Jahangir, wherein Guru Arjan blessed Khusrau and thus the losing side. Jahangir was jealous and outraged, and therefore he ordered the Guru's execution. But according to Jahangir's own autobiography, most probably he didn't understand the importance of Sikh gurus. He referred to Guru Arjan as a Hindu, who had "captured many of the simple-hearted of the Hindus and even of the ignorant and foolish followers of Islam, by his ways and manners...for the three or four generations(of spiritual successors) they had kept this shop warm." The execution of Guru Arjan Dev marks a sharp contrast to Jahangir's tolerant attitude towards other religions such as Hinduism and Christianity.

The Sikh tradition has a competing view. It states that the Guru's execution was a part of the ongoing persecution of the Sikhs by Islamic authorities in the Mughal Empire, and that the Mughal rulers of Punjab were alarmed at the growth of the Panth. According to Jahangir's autobiography Tuzk-e-Jahangiri (Jahangirnama) which discussed Guru Arjan's support for his rebellious son Khusrau Mirza, too many people were becoming persuaded by Guru Arjan's teachings and if Guru Arjan did not become a Muslim, the Sikh Panth had to be extinguished.

In 1606 CE, the Guru was imprisoned in Lahore Fort, where by some accounts he was tortured and executed, and by other accounts, the method of his death remains unresolved. The traditional Sikh account states that the Mughal emperor Jahangir demanded a fine of 200,000 rupees and demanded that Guru Arjan erase some of the hymns in the text that he found offensive. The Guru refused to remove the lines and pay the fine, which state the Sikh accounts, led to his execution. Some Muslim traditional accounts such as of Latif in 19th-century states that Guru Arjan was dictatorial, someone who lived in splendour with "costly attire", who had left aside the rosary and the clothes of a saint (fakir). Shaikh Ahmad Sirhindi cheered the punishment and execution of Guru Arjun, calling the Sikh Guru an infidel. In contrast, Mian Mir – the Sufi friend of Guru Arjan, lobbied when Jehangir ordered the execution and the confiscation of Guru Arjan's property, then got the confiscation order deferred, according to Rishi Singh.

Some scholars state that the evidence is unclear whether his death was due to execution, torture or forced drowning in the Ravi river. J.S. Grewal notes that Sikh sources from the seventeenth and eighteenth-century contain contradictory reports of Guru Arjan's death. J. F. Richard states that Jahangir was persistently hostile to popularly venerated saints, not just Sikhism. Bhai Gurdas was a contemporary of Guru Arjan and is a noted 17th-century Sikh chronicler. His eyewitness account recorded Guru Arjan's life, and the order by Emperor Jahangir to torture the Guru to death.

A contemporary Jesuit account, written by Spanish Jesuit missionary Jerome Xavier (1549–1617), who was in Lahore at the time, records that the Sikhs tried to get Jahangir to substitute the torture and death sentence to a heavy fine, but this attempt failed. Dabistan-i Mazahib Mobad states Jahangir tortured Guru Arjan in the hopes of extracting the money and public repudiation of his spiritual convictions, but the Guru refused and was executed. Jerome Xavier, in appreciation of the courage of Guru Arjun, wrote back to Lisbon, that Guru Arjan suffered and was tormented.

According to the Sikh tradition, before his execution, Guru Arjan instructed his son and successor Hargobind to take up arms, and resist tyranny. His execution led the Sikh Panth to become armed and pursue resistance to persecution under the Mughal rule. Michael Barnes states that the resolve and death of Guru Arjun strengthened the conviction among Sikhs that, "personal piety must have a core of moral strength. A virtuous soul must be a courageous soul. Willingness to suffer trial for one's convictions was a religious imperative".

Historical reconstruction

There are several stories and versions about how, where and why Guru Arjan died. Recent scholarship have offered alternative analyses, wary of "exaggerating fragmentary traces of documentary evidence in historical analysis". The alternate versions include stories about the role of Guru Arjan in a conflict between the Mughal Emperor Jahangir and his son who Jahangir suspected of trying to organize a patricidal coup. An alternate version highlights the role of a Hindu minister of Jahangir named Chandu Shah. He, in one version, takes revenge on Guru Arjan for not marrying his son Hargobind to Chandu Shah's daughter. In another Lahore version, Chandu Shah actually prevents Guru Arjan from suffering torture and death by Muslims by paying 200,000 rupees (100,000 crusados) to Jahangir, but then keeps him and emotionally torments him to death in his house. Several alternative versions of the story try to absolve Jahangir and the Mughal empire of any responsibility, but have no trace or support in the documentary evidence from early 17th century, such as the records of Jesuit priest Jerome Xavier and the memoirs of Jahangir.

Legacy

Amritsar
Guru Arjan's father Guru Ram Das founded the town named after him "Ramdaspur", around a large man-made water pool called "Ramdas Sarovar". Guru Arjan continued the infrastructure-building effort of his father. The town expanded during the time of Guru Arjan, financed by donations and constructed by voluntary work. The pool area grew into a temple complex with the gurdwara Harmandir Sahib near the pool. Guru Arjan installed the scripture of Sikhism inside the new temple in 1604. The city that emerged is now known as Amritsar, and is the holiest pilgrimage site in Sikhism.

Continuing the efforts of Guru Ram Das, Guru Arjan established Amritsar as a primary Sikh pilgrimage destination. He wrote a voluminous amount of Sikh scripture including the popular Sukhmani Sahib. Guru Arjan is credited with completing many other infrastructure projects, such as water reservoirs called Santokhsar (lake of peace) and Gongsar (lake of Gongaga), founding the towns of Tarn Taran, Kartarpur and Hargobindpur.

Community expansion
While having completing the Harmandir Sahib with dasvand donations during the first decade of his guruship between 1581 and 1589, creating a rallying point for the community and a center for Sikh activity, and a place for the installment of the Adi Granth, Guru Arjan had also gone on a tour of Majha and Doaba in Punjab, where he would found the towns. Due to their central location in the Punjab heartland, the ranks of Sikhs would swell, especially among the Jatt peasantry, and create a level of prosperity for them; Guru Arjan would serve not only as a spiritual mentor but as a sovereign leader (sacchā pādshāh) for his followers in his own right.

Adi Granth
According to the Sikh tradition, Guru Arjan compiled the Adi Granth by collecting hymns of past Gurus from many places, then rejecting those that he considered as fakes or to be diverging from the teachings of the Gurus. His approved collection included hymns from the first four Gurus of Sikhism, those he composed, as well as 17 Hindu bards and 2 Muslim bards. The compilation was completed on August 30, 1604, according to the Sikh tradition and installed in the Harmandir Sahib temple on September 1, 1604.

Guru Arjan was a prolific poet who composed 2,218 hymns. More than half of the volume of Guru Granth Sahib and the largest collection of hymns has been composed by Guru Arjan. According to Christopher Shackle and Arvind-Pal Singh Mandair, Guru Arjan's compositions combined spiritual message in an "encyclopedic linguistic sophistication" with "Braj Bhasha forms and learned Sanskrit vocabulary".

After Guru Arjan completed and installed the Adi Granth in the Harimandir Sahib, Emperor Akbar was informed of the development with the allegation that it contained teachings hostile to Islam. He ordered a copy be brought to him. Guru Arjan sent him a copy on a thali (plate), with the following message that was later added to the expanded text:

The Akbarnama by Abu'l-Fazl Allami mentions that Guru Arjan met the Mughal emperor Akbar and his cortege in 1598. According to Louis Fenech, this meeting likely influenced the development of Sikh manuscriptology and the later martial tradition.

One of the Sikh community disputes following Guru Ram Das was the emergence of new hymns claiming to have been composed by Nanak. According to the faction led by Guru Arjan, these hymns were distorted and fake, with some blaming Prithi Chand and his Sikh faction for having composed and circulated them. The concern and the possibility of wrong propaganda, immoral teachings and inauthentic Gurbani led Guru Arjan to initiate a major effort to collect, study, approve and compile a written official scripture, and this he called Adi Granth, the first edition of the Sikh scripture by 1604.

The composition of both Prithi Chand and his followers have been preserved in the Mina texts of Sikhism, while the mainstream and larger Sikh tradition adopted the Guru Granth Sahib scripture that ultimately emerged from the initiative of Guru Arjan.

Spelling
Some scholars spell Guru Arjan's name as 'Guru Arjun'.

Gallery

See also

 Sukhmani Sahib
 Guru Granth Sahib

Notes

References

Bibliography
https://www.amazon.com/History-Sikhs-Vol-Gurus-1469-1708/dp/8121502764/ref=pd_rhf_d_dp_s_ci_mcx_mr_hp_d_sccl_1_3/145-9098560-6919419?pd_rd_w=EhQDc&content-id=amzn1.sym.0a853d15-c5a9-4695-90cd-fdc0b630b803&pf_rd_p=0a853d15-c5a9-4695-90cd-fdc0b630b803&pf_rd_r=43STA5ET49JHAD1KW93F&pd_rd_wg=QgeDc&pd_rd_r=a73a726d-d340-472d-a1b7-10ee05e97b57&pd_rd_i=8121502764&psc=1
 
History of the Panjab, Syad Muhammad Latif, Published by: Kalyani Publishers, Ludhiana, Punjab, India. 
 Philosophy of 'Charhdi Kala' and Higher State of Mind in Sri Guru Granth Sahib, Dr. Harjinder Singh Majhail, 2010, Published by: Deepak Publishers, Jalandhar, Punjab, India. 
SIKH HISTORY IN 10 VOLUMES, Dr Harjinder Singh Dilgeer, Published by: The Sikh University Press, Brussels, Belgium. ISBN 2- 930247-41-X

External links

www.bbc.co.uk
sgpc.net

Arjan
Sikh martyrs
1563 births
1606 deaths
Punjabi people
1563 in India
People executed by the Mughal Empire
Executed Indian people
Indian city founders
 People executed for refusing to convert to Islam
17th-century executions in India